W. William Wilt (April 15, 1918 – September 28, 2004) is a former Republican member of the Pennsylvania House of Representatives.

References

Republican Party members of the Pennsylvania House of Representatives
1918 births
2004 deaths
20th-century American politicians